Giuseppe "Peppino" Russo (13 March 1913 - 5 July 2010) was an Italian hurdler and sport coach, he was 7th in the 400 m hs at the 1938 European Athletics Championships.

Biography
Federal technician from 1947 to 1968, he participated as athletic coach of the sprinting, in six Olympics from London 1948 to Mexico City 1968. Among the athletes he trained there was Livio Berruti, gold medal in the 200 m at the Olympics in Rome 1960.

Achievements

See also
 Italy at the 1938 European Athletics Championships

References

External links
 Giuseppe Russo at FIDAL 
 Giuseppe Russo at Faustoeugeni.it 
 Giuseppe Russo at Spiridon Italia 

1913 births
2010 deaths
Italian male hurdlers
Italian athletics coaches
Sportspeople from Palermo
20th-century Italian people